Seth Banee Carr (born August 16, 2007) is an American actor from  Anaheim, California. He is known for his role as young Killmonger in the film Black Panther (2018) and for his first leading role on Netflix‘s film The Main Event (2020).

Early life and career
Born on August 16, 2007, in Anaheim, CA, Carr started his career at 3-months-old, as a baby model. Under TalentWorks management, Carr’s career grew and he transitioned into an actor.

Filmography

Film

Television

References

External links
 

21st-century American male actors
American male film actors
2007 births
African-American male child actors
American male child actors
American male television actors
Living people
21st-century African-American people
Male actors from Anaheim, California